The Hanriot HD.40S (S- Sanitaire - medical transport)was a two-seat medical transport aircraft built in the 1920s, derived from the Hanriot HD.14S.

Specifications (HD.40S)

References

Hanriot aircraft
Single-engined tractor aircraft
Aircraft first flown in 1925